Sweeney Todd: The Demon Barber of Fleet Street: The Motion Picture Soundtrack is a soundtrack to the film of the same name, released on December 18, 2007.

In a change from the original, Sondheim cut the show's famous opening number, "The Ballad of Sweeney Todd", explaining, "Why have a chorus singing about 'attending the tale of Sweeney Todd' when you could just go ahead and attend it?" Sondheim acknowledged that, in adapting a musical to film, the plot has to be kept moving, and was sent MP3 files of his shortened songs by Mike Higham, the film's music producer, for approval. Several other songs were also cut, and Sondheim noted that there were "many changes, additions and deletions... [though]... if you just go along with it, I think you'll have a spectacular time." To create a larger, more cinematic feel, the score was reorchestrated by the stage musical's original orchestrator, Jonathan Tunick, who increased the orchestra from twenty-seven musicians to seventy-eight.

The Sweeney Todd: The Demon Barber of Fleet Street Deluxe Complete Edition soundtrack was released on December 18, 2007. Johnny Depp's singing was described by a New York Times reviewer as "harsh and thin, but amazingly forceful". Another critic adds that, though Depp's voice "does not have much heft or power", "his ear is obviously excellent, because his pitch is dead-on accurate... Beyond his good pitch and phrasing, the expressive colorings of his singing are crucial to the portrayal. Beneath this Sweeney's vacant, sullen exterior is a man consumed with a murderous rage that threatens to burst forth every time he slowly takes a breath and is poised to speak. Yet when he sings, his voice crackles and breaks with sadness."

Track listing

* Not on the "Highlights" version of the soundtrack.** Tracks that are significantly longer than their "Highlights" counterparts.*** Song is either written specially or adapted for the film.

Additional album personnel
 Executive soundtrack album producers: Tim Burton and Robert Hurwitz
 Executive in charge of music for Warner Bros. Pictures: Doug Frank
 Album Produced by Mike Higham
 Orchestra recorded by Jake Jackson and Geoff Foster at Air Lyndhurst Studios, London
 Conducted by Paul Gemignani
 Orchestrations by Jonathan Tunick
 Additional orchestrations by Julian Kershaw
 Additional arrangements by Mike Higham and Alex Heffes
 Vocals for Mr. Depp produced by Bruce Witkin
 Vocals recorded by Andy Richards at Out of Eden, London
 Rugby School Chapel Organ by Andy Richards
 Music editors: Sam Southwick, John Warhurst
 Mixed by Andy Richards at Out of Eden, London
 Mastered by Robert C. Ludwig at Gateway Mastering & DVD, Portland, ME
 Design by Gabriele Wilson
 Photograph of Stephen Sondheim by Jarry Jackson
 For Nonesuch Records:
 Production supervisor: Katrina Beznicki
 Production manager: Eli Cane
 Editorial coordinator: Robert Edridge-Waks

Charts

Certifications and sales

References

External links
 
 Soundtracks for 'Sweeney Todd: The Demon Barber of Fleet Street' at Internet Movie Database

2007 soundtrack albums
Musical film soundtracks
Sweeney Todd
DreamWorks Records soundtracks
Warner Records soundtracks
Horror film soundtracks